WZ-132 Light Tank was a Chinese light tank which was developed between the 1960s and 1970s. Its development lasted for more than ten years before it was set aside, ultimately proving too technical to be brought into production.

Design and development
During the 1960s and 70s, in what became known as the Sino-Soviet split, the relationship between China and the Soviet Union became extremely tense. In competition with Soviet tank designers, the Chinese developed several tanks including the Type 59, Type 62, and Type 63 variants. The WZ-132 was also designed around this time; however, its technical indicators were too high for China at that time to produce it in large numbers and as a result, its specifications were changed several times before the design was set aside in 1975.

With a crew of four – commander, loader, gunner, driver – the vehicle's primary armament consisted of a single 100 mm (4 in) smoothbore gun, with a single 12.7 mm (0.5 in) machine gun and two 7.62 mm (0.3 in) machine guns as secondary weapons. At least two other vehicles were equipped with different weapons, with one tank sporting a 85mm smoothbore gun, and another having a 76.2mm gun as its main armament with an alleged autoloader that was never completed. The vehicle used torsion bar suspension. Towards the end stage of development, the WZ-132 incorporated a new fire control system including a ballistic computer and a two-plane stabilizer, as well as an image intensifier and laser rangefinder for the gunner. The late-stage prototypes also received an infrared searchlight and respective infrared night vision devices for the commander and the driver.

See also
WZ-111
Type 69
Type 62

References

Citations

Bibliography
 

Light tanks of the People's Republic of China
Light tanks of the Cold War
Military vehicles introduced in the 1960s